The Oregon Coast Range, often called simply the Coast Range and sometimes the Pacific Coast Range, is a mountain range, in the Pacific Coast Ranges physiographic region,  in the U.S. state of Oregon along the Pacific Ocean. The coast range has three main sections, a Northern, Central, and Southern.

The oldest portions of the range are over 60 million years old, with volcanics and a forearc basin as the primary mountain building processes responsible for the range. It is part of the larger grouping known as the Pacific Coast Ranges that extends over much of the western edge of North America from California to Alaska. The range creates a rain shadow effect for the Willamette Valley that lies to the east of the mountains, creating a more stable climate and significantly less rain than the coastal region of the state. To the west where the range over-shadows the Oregon Coast, the range causes more precipitation to fall on that side of the mountains, contributing to the numerous rivers that flow to the Pacific Ocean.

Marys Peak in the Central Coast Range is the highest peak at 4,097 feet (1,248 m). Logging is a major industry in the range in both private and government owned forests. Both the state and federal government manage forests in the Oregon Coast Range. The mountains are home to a variety of wildlife including black bear, elk, deer, beaver, many species of birds, and bats among others. Fish, including salmon and trout, and other aquatic life inhabit the streams and rivers flowing through the range.

Geology

Volcanic activity approximately 66 million years ago in the Cretaceous Period created offshore islands beginning in the southern portion of the current range.  These Roseburg volcanics were followed by the Siletz River Volcanics in the northern portions of the range, and lastly a series of basalt flows from the Columbia River basalts also added to these formations with some smaller flows in-between. Much of the formations are the result of pillow basalt formations created when a hot basalt flow rapidly cooled upon meeting the salt water of the ocean. These deposits offshore were then pushed into the continental plate as a forearc basin rotating slowly over millions of years. This tectonic collision forced the basalt formations (and newer sedimentary rock formations that include marine terrace deposits) upward and created the coastal range.

Additional basalt flows originated from Eastern Oregon and added to the layers that were uplifted, as the newer Cascade Mountains had not yet been formed. By the Early Oligocene period c. 30 million years ago the current coastline was in place and erosion has continued to shape the range. primarily through rivers cutting deep valleys through the igneous and sedimentary rocks.

The geologic boundaries of the coast range formation extend from southwest Washington state in the north to around the Coquille River in the south where the older and taller Klamath Mountains begin. In the east the mountains begin as foothills forming the western edge of the Willamette Valley and continue west to the coastline and beyond where the basalt formation tapers off into the continental shelf and ends at the continental slope with several banks and basins off shore.

Physiographically, they are a section of the larger Pacific Border province, which in turn are part of the larger Pacific Mountain System physiographic division.

Climate

A mild maritime climate prevails throughout the range with temperature and precipitation varying due to elevation and distance from the coastline. Characteristics of the climate include cool dry summers followed by mild and wet winters. The majority of precipitation accumulates in the form of rain, with snow during the winter months at the higher elevations, but no permanent snow pack. The further inland and the more southerly portions have a more Mediterranean climate that is more similar to the climate of the Willamette Valley. The Coast Range creates a rain shadow effect by forcing moisture laden clouds to rise by expelling moisture. This shields the Willamette Valley and causes a less maritime climate with hotter summers and less precipitation than the Oregon Coast.

Sections

The Oregon Coast Range is divided into three separate sections: North, Central, and South. In the south is the oldest portion of the range with formation beginning in the Paleocene era with the Roseburg volcanics, while the newest section is the northernmost portion formed first with the Siletz River Volcanics. The Central and Northern sections contain more sedimentary rocks from the mud, silt, sand, and other volcanic debris than the lower Southern section. Also, the Oregon Coast Range is home to over 50 mammal species, over 100 species of birds, and nearly 30 reptile or amphibian species that spent significant portions of their life cycle in the mountains.

North

Forests here are considered to be some of the most productive timber land in the world. Trees include primarily Sitka spruce, western redcedar, Douglas-fir, and western hemlock. Other plants include huckleberry, salmonberry, salal, vine maple, Oregon grape, bracken fern, and thimble-berry among others.

Central

Located between the Salmon River and the Umpqua River on the north and south, the Central range is bounded by the Willamette Valley on the east and the Pacific Ocean to the west. Portions of the range are inside the Siuslaw National Forest along with three designated wilderness areas: Drift Creek Wilderness, Cummins Creek Wilderness and the Rock Creek Wilderness. Larger animals that live in these section include deer, elk, bobcat, and bear. Bear are black bear while deer are mule and black-tailed deer species. Other mammals here are mountain beaver, beavers, coyote, mink, river otter, mountain lion, porcupines, skunks, and brush rabbit.

South

The southernmost section of the Coast Range is located in the southwest portion of Oregon between the middle fork of the Coquille River in the south and the Umpqua River on the north. Oregon Route 38 is the general divide between the Central and Southern portions of the Coast Range. On the south the Coquille River’s middle fork provides the general dividing line between the Central Range and the Klamath Mountains to the south and east.

Birds living in the Southern Coast Range include a variety of smaller and larger bird species. Species include peregrine falcons, pileated woodpeckers, olive-sided flycatcher, and western bluebirds among others. The threatened northern spotted owl also inhabit the mountain forests. Animal life in the rivers, streams, and lakes include lamprey, coastal cutthroat trout, dace, Umpqua chub, frogs, salamander, turtles, coho salmon, steelhead trout, and others.

Peaks

Five tallest peaks in the Oregon Coast Range:
 Marys Peak, 4,101 feet
 Rogers Peak, 3,706 feet
 Grass Mountain, 3,615 feet, 
 Laurel Mountain, 3,592 feet, 
 Bone Mountain, 3,547 feet

Rivers

The following rivers have their headwaters in the Oregon Coast Range:

Drains to Pacific Ocean:
Alsea River
Coos River
Coquille River
D River
Kilchis River
Little Nestucca River
Miami River
Necanicum River
Nehalem River
Nestucca River
Salmonberry River
Salmon River
Siletz River
Siltcoos River
Siuslaw River
Smith River
Tillamook River
Trask River
Umpqua River
Wilson River
Yachats River
Yaquina River

Drains to Columbia River:
Clatskanie River
John Day River
Klaskanine River
Lewis and Clark River
Skipanon River
Wallooskee River
Youngs River
Drains to Willamette River:
Coast Fork Willamette River
Long Tom River
Luckiamute River
Marys River
Tualatin River
Yamhill River

See also
Coast Range (ecoregion)

References

External links

 
 
Mountain ranges of Oregon
Oregon Coast Range
Physiographic sections
Landforms of Benton County, Oregon
Landforms of Tillamook County, Oregon
Landforms of Washington County, Oregon
Landforms of Yamhill County, Oregon
Landforms of Clatsop County, Oregon
Landforms of Polk County, Oregon
Landforms of Douglas County, Oregon
Landforms of Coos County, Oregon